The Men's time trial of the 2015 UCI Road World Championships is a cycling event that took place on September 23, 2015 in Richmond, Virginia, United States. It was the 22nd edition of the championship. Bradley Wiggins was the outgoing champion, but did not defend his title.

Vasil Kiryienka won the gold medal for Belarus, recording a time 9.08 seconds quicker than his closest rival, Italian rider Adriano Malori. The podium was completed by France's Jérôme Coppel, 26.62 seconds behind Kiryienka's winning time.

Course
The riders began their race 20 miles north of Richmond at Kings Dominion, Virginia's premier amusement park in Hanover County. Racers then went past Meadow Event Park, home to the State Fair of Virginia and birthplace of thoroughbred racing legend Secretariat. Racers headed south on long, open straights past the Hanover County Courthouse, the third oldest courthouse still in use in the U.S. and dating back to about 1740. Long hills on Brook and Wilkinson roads brought the racers back into the city through Virginia Union University before turning into downtown. Nearly half the turns of the entire route fell within the closing kilometers, the second to last of which was to ascend  on Governor Street. At the top, the riders had to take a sharp left turn onto the false-flat finishing straight,  to the finish.

Qualification

Qualification for the event
All National Federations were allowed to enter four riders for the race, with a maximum of two riders to start. In addition to this number, the outgoing World Champion and the current continental champions were also able to take part.

Olympic qualification
This time trial was also part of the qualification of the men's time trial at the 2016 Summer Olympics. The first ten nations in the time trial qualified one athlete.

Schedule
All times are in Eastern Daylight Time (UTC-4).

Start list
The following riders were confirmed by their respective nations.

Final classification

References

Men's time trial
UCI Road World Championships – Men's time trial
2015 in men's road cycling